Pool suction drain injury, also known as suction entrapment, occurs when the drain of a wading pool, swimming pool, hot tub, or fountain sucks in a swimmer's jewelry, torso, limbs, hair or buttocks. Evisceration, also known as disembowelment, could happen in case of buttock entrapment. 

This can drown the entrapped person, despite the rescue efforts of multiple adults.

One way to make drains safer is to install shut-off valves and dome-shape drains that are less likely to create a suction effect with the human body, as required in the United States by the 2007 Virginia Graeme Baker Pool and Spa Safety Act.

Notable cases

United States
Valerie Lakey. 1993, North Carolina. She received a $25 million settlement. It was a landmark case of lawyer (later Senator) John Edwards.
Virginia Graeme Baker, June 2002. Granddaughter of former Secretary of State James Baker. She drowned, but her official cause of death was "suction entrapment due to a faulty drain cover". Congress passed a pool safety act under her name in 2007.
Abigail Taylor, 2007. She died in 2008 as a result of her injuries despite subsequent surgeries. Scott and Katey Taylor, her parents, lobbied for the Virginia Graeme Baker Pool and Spa Safety Act, which was passed the year of Abigail's injury.
Evan Pappas. 2018, South Carolina. Known for surviving an entrapment of 7 minutes 40 seconds in a lazy river.

Egypt
Salma Bashir. 2008, Alexandria. During a holiday with her family, she  was disemboweled while in the kids' swimming pool. As of the time of the report, she was fed by a TPN bag and was waiting for a multiple organ transplant.

References

Injuries
Drowning
Swimming pools